Gigantic Music is an independent record label, founded by Brian Devine in 2000. Gigantic Music is based out of New York City.

Gigantic Music signed New York's well-established act The Walkmen for the band's fourth album, You & Me. Other acts include Gringo Star, Shy Child, and Your Youth.

Signed Artists

Current

Birds Of Avalon
Gringo Star
Shy Child
Your Youth

Former

ARMS (band)
Aa (Big A Little a)
The Boggs
The Builders and the Butchers
Chubby
The Cloud Room
Dragons of Zynth
Frances (band)
Gringo Star
Harlem Shakes
Human Television
The Hundred in the Hands
Kevin Ayers
Ladell McLin
Low Frequency in Stereo
The Rumble Strips
Shelby
Seedy Gonzalez
Some Action
The Walkmen

References

External links
 http://www.giganticmusic.com

American independent record labels